Nowshera is the notified area in the municipal committee of Srinagar, in the Indian union territory of Jammu and Kashmir. It is one of the oldest residential places in Srinagar founded by Zain-ul-Abidin. It is located about 9.9 km towards North from the commercial center of Kashmir.

History
The history of Nowshera dates back to the time of Zain-ul-Abidin who established and settled the area as the capital of Kashmir Valley. The ruins of that capital city can be still traced today. Most of the residential places are quite old fashioned and date back to the time when people at the first place settled here similar to one's in Downtown Srinagar.

Geography
Nowshera is located   towards North from district headquarters in Srinagar. The area is bounded by Soura towards North, Zadibal towards South, Lal Bazar towards East and Zanimar towards West.

See also
Rajbagh

References

Cities and towns in Srinagar district